Attilio Simonetti (1843–1925) was an Italian painter and Antiquarian.

Biography
He was born and resided mainly in Rome: a son of Francesco, a Roman jeweler and engraver, and Carolina née Raffaeli, from a family of mosaicists. He showed a talent for art at an early age, which brought him to the attention of a family friend, the painter Marià Fortuny. At the age of sixteen, he began his formal studies.

In 1868, Simoneti submitted two paintings to an exhibition at the Brera of Milan: Interior of Kitchen at Trastevere and Gate at via dei Carbonari. At the 1877 Neapolitan Esposizione Nazionale di Belle Arti, he displayed a copy of the paintings  "L'araldo" and "Il tamburino", which were purchased by the soon-to-be King, Umberto I. While in Naples, he made friends with and was encouraged by Filippo Palizzi, who invited him to exhibit in Campania.

He also served as executor for the sale of antiquarian objects collected by his old friend, Fortuny, who had died in 1874. This would encourage him to establish his own antiques business.

Among his works: After the Dance; exhibited in 1877 in Naples: Un araldo; Un tamburo;  Ogni speranza è morta; Via Giuseppe Mancinelli in Palazzuolo Castracelo. He also exhibited at the 1883 Mostra of Fine Arts in Rome: some paintings and watercolors, including A governor; Gioia materna; and  La filatrice. He also had a good relationship with Adolphe Goupil of the Goupil Gallery of Paris, famed for his patronage of impressionism.

His clients included John Pierpont Morgan and William Waldorf Astor, who hired him to design and furnish his "Villa Pompeiana" in Sorrento; inspired by the House of the Vettii in Pompeii.

He died in Rome. The Simonetti family continued the antiquarian business.

References

External links

More works by Simonetti @ ArtNet

1843 births
1925 deaths
19th-century Italian painters
20th-century Italian painters
Italian male painters
Neo-Pompeian painters
Orientalist painters
People from Rome
19th-century Italian male artists
20th-century Italian male artists